The Ukrainian women's national field hockey team represents Ukraine in the international field hockey competitions. The team is coached by Victor Kostyukevych.

Competitive record

Hockey World Cup

EuroHockey Championship

EuroHockey Championship II
2009 – 6th place
2011 – 5th place
2013 – 6th place
2015 – 8th place
2017 – 6th place
2019 – 7th place

EuroHockey Championship III
2021 –

Hockey World League
2012–13 – Round 1
2014–15 – 32nd place
2016–17 – 24th place

Women's Hockey Series
2018–19 – Second round

See also
Ukraine men's national field hockey team

References

External links
Ukrainian Field Hockey Federation
FIH profile

Field hockey
European women's national field hockey teams
National team